Arturo David Ramírez Torres (born 18 February 1981) is an Argentine football midfielder.

Career

Ramírez started his professional career in 2001 with Defensores de Belgrano de Villa Ramallo. Subsequently, he joined Sportivo Italiano, where he played for 3 years. In the second semester of 2003, he was transferred to Ferro Carril Oeste. Two years later, Ramírez was signed by Olimpo, therefore having his first experience in the Argentine top division.

The midfielder had his first experience outside his country playing for Spanish SD Ponferradina on a six-months loan during 2007. He returned to his country later that year to join Godoy Cruz, in the second division.

In 2008, Ramírez was signed by Gimnasia y Esgrima de Jujuy, where he played 9 games without scoring during the 2008 Apertura. In January of that year, Ramírez moved to Chile to play for Unión Española. During the 2009 Apertura, he played 17 matches (3 goals), and finished runner-up of the Chilean Primera División with the team. In the second half of 2009, he played with Unión Española the Copa Sudamericana, totaling 4 matches and 1 goal (against Vélez Sársfield).

In January 2010, Ramírez returned to Argentina signing again with Godoy Cruz, this time in the first division. He played a total 32 games (10 goals) during his year-long spell with the Mendoza Province team, and helped them finish 3rd in the 2010 Clausura and 5th in the 2010 Apertura.

On 27 January 2011, he agreed to join Vélez Sársfield, that bought his transfer rights from Godoy Cruz in approximately US$3 million. On 15 February 2011 he made his Copa Libertadores debut at the age of 29 and scored his first goal for Vélez in a 3–0 win against Caracas FC. On his first season with Vélez, he helped his team to win the 2011 Clausura tournament and reach the semi-finals of the Copa Libertadores. Despite not being a regular starter, he was the team's top scorer during the league championship, with 8 goals in 14 games.

Honours
Vélez Sársfield
Argentine Primera División (1): 2011 Clausura

References

External links
 Argentine Primera statistics at Futbol XXI 
 
 

1981 births
Living people
Footballers from Buenos Aires
Argentine footballers
Argentine expatriate footballers
Ferro Carril Oeste footballers
Argentine Primera División players
Olimpo footballers
Gimnasia y Esgrima de Jujuy footballers
Godoy Cruz Antonio Tomba footballers
Club Atlético Vélez Sarsfield footballers
SD Ponferradina players
Unión Española footballers
Expatriate footballers in Chile
Expatriate footballers in Spain
Association football midfielders